Nomeansno (sometimes stylized as NoMeansNo or spelled No Means No) was a Canadian punk rock band formed in Victoria, British Columbia and later relocated to Vancouver.  They issued 11 albums, including a collaborative album with Jello Biafra, as well as numerous EPs and singles.  Critic Martin Popoff described their music as "the mightiest merger between the hateful aggression of punk and the discipline of heavy metal."  Nomeansno's distinct hardcore punk sound, complex instrumentation, and dark, "savagely intelligent" lyrics inspired subsequent musicians.  They are often considered foundational in the punk jazz and post-hardcore movements, and have been cited as a formative influence on the math rock and emo genres.

Formed in 1979 by brothers Rob and John Wright, the group began as a two-piece punk band influenced by jazz and progressive rock.  They self-released their debut Mama LP in 1982.  Adding guitarist Andy Kerr the following year, the group signed with the Alternative Tentacles imprint and continued to expand their audience.  Kerr departed in 1992 after five LPs with the band, and the group returned to its two-piece formation for the Why Do They Call Me Mr. Happy? album.

Guitarist Tom Holliston, and briefly second drummer Ken Kempster, joined in 1993, and Nomeansno continued touring and recording extensively while operating their own Wrong Records label.  After three further LPs, they left Alternative Tentacles and issued their final album, All Roads Lead to Ausfahrt, in 2006.  They were inducted into the Western Canadian Music Hall of Fame in 2015, and announced their retirement the following year.

History

Early years as two-piece, Mama (1979–1982)
In 1979 and at age 25, Rob Wright returned to his family's home in Victoria after studying in Calgary. John Wright, Rob's younger brother by eight years, played drums in the school jazz band, and the two were inspired to play punk rock after seeing D.O.A. perform at the University of Victoria.  They began rehearsing in their parents' basement in 1979, and took the name Nomeansno from an anti-date rape slogan that was found on a graffitied wall. They also briefly gigged as the rhythm section for the local cover band Castle.

Nomeansno recorded its earliest material in the months that followed on a TASCAM four-track recorder, with Rob playing electric guitar and bass, John playing keyboards and drums, and both brothers singing.  Some of these recordings were issued as their first two self-released 7"s, the "Look, Here Come the Wormies / SS Social Service" single (a 1980 split with Mass Appeal, whose recording lineup featured both Wright Brothers), and the Betrayal, Fear, Anger, Hatred EP of 1981.

The brothers began performing live as a bass-and-drums duo in 1981.  Their sound developed without a guitar, and John Wright later reflected on these developments:

Some of the songs they played in this period were released on the Mama LP, which was self-released in a limited pressing in 1982.  Writing for Trouser Press, critic Ira Robbins described Mama and the early 7"s as "Devo on a jazz trip, Motörhead after art school, or Wire on psychotic steroids."  This same year, John Wright also joined the Victoria punk band The Infamous Scientists.

With Andy Kerr, You Kill Me, Small Parts Isolated and Destroyed (1983–1989)
The Infamous Scientists disbanded in 1983, and their guitarist and vocalist Andy Kerr joined Nomeansno several months later. Kerr brought a distinct hardcore punk edge to Nomeansno's sound, creating a buzz-saw guitar tone by playing through a Fender Bassman amplifier and a P.A. speaker.  Nomeansno became a fixture in the British Columbia punk scene despite playing music that did not always conform to punk rock standards.  The You Kill Me EP in 1985 on the Undergrowth Records imprint exhibited their experimental sound on dark and ponderous songs like "Body Bag" and a cover of "Manic Depression" by Jimi Hendrix. The three also began performing Ramones covers and more traditional punk music as The Hanson Brothers, a side project that would later receive more of their attention.

Issued initially by the Montreal punk label Psyche Industry, the band released Sex Mad, their second LP and first with Kerr.  The album further expanded the band's experimental and progressive punk sound, yielding the single "Dad". The song was a minor college radio hit, which AllMusic reviewer Adam Bregman called "a bit chilling, even though it's spit out at slam-pit's pace".  Kerr, the song's lead vocalist, increasingly became responsible for lead vocals as Rob Wright suffered from nodules on his vocal cords.

They soon signed with the seminal punk rock label Alternative Tentacles, run by Jello Biafra of the Dead Kennedys. This, along with frequent touring in North America and Europe, helped the band to garner a larger audience.  In 1988, the group issued two releases recorded with producer Cecil English: The Day Everything Became Nothing EP and the Small Parts Isolated and Destroyed album.  Alternative Tentacles compiled the two together on a single CD, The Day Everything Became Isolated and Destroyed.  AllMusic reviewer Sean Carruthers called the experimental recordings "less aggressive" than, but nonetheless worthy of, the band's previous efforts.

Wrong, 0 + 2 = 1, Kerr's departure (1989–1992)

Rob Wright's vocal cords began to heal, and he again began acting as the group's lead vocalist.  In 1989, the band issued their fourth album, Wrong, to wide critical acclaim.  For AllMusic, Carruthers wrote that "[t]he playing is incredibly skilled;" critic Martin Popoff in writing for The Collector's Guide to Heavy Metal called Wrong the band's best album and rated the album 10 out of 10 points.  The band's extensive touring in support of the record is documented in part on the Live + Cuddly album, recorded in Holland in 1990. John Wright later reported that circa 1990 the band became profitable enough that "we didn't have to have day jobs."

The band released a collaborative LP with Biafra, The Sky Is Falling and I Want My Mommy, in 1991.  Shortly thereafter, they issued 0 + 2 = 1, their fifth album and final release with Kerr.  In a mixed review, AllMusic critic Adam Bregman praised 0 + 2 = 1 for its finer moments, but was concerned by its overall length and ponderousness.

Kerr departed the band after touring in support of the record and emigrated to the Netherlands. He went on to release two LPs with Hissanol, a collaboration with Scott Henderson of Shovlhed. He subsequently released a solo album in 1997 before forming the duo Two Pin Din with Wilf Plum of Dog Faced Hermans in 2005.

Side projects, Why Do They Call Me Mr. Happy? (1992–1993)
The Wright brothers had begun to focus on their side project, The Hanson Brothers. Dressing as a mock group of backward Canadian ice hockey players and fans, they derived the band's name and personae from a group of characters in the 1977 George Roy Hill film Slap Shot starring Paul Newman. With John acting as lead vocalist, the Wright brothers were joined by guitarist Tom Holliston of the Showbusiness Giants and drummer Ken Jensen of D.O.A.  With encouragement from Alternative Tentacles to record an LP, The Hanson Brothers issued the Gross Misconduct album in 1992.

The Wright brothers also remained active with other endeavors.  Rob Wright began performing as a solo artist under the name Mr. Wrong, appearing as a character dressed as an authoritarian priest.  John Wright became a member of D.O.A. for several years. The brothers also continued to expand Wrong Records, their own imprint.

In 1993, the brothers assembled material for a sixth Nomeansno LP and recorded Why Do They Call Me Mr. Happy? as a duo. AllMusic critic Ned Raggett later praised the album's balance, arguing that it reached dark and sinister depths while also exhibiting subtler and more introspective moments.  The Wrights also compiled the collection Mr. Right & Mr. Wrong: One Down & Two to Go, comprising early demos, studio outtakes, and additional material, which was released on Wrong the following year.

With Tom Holliston, Worldhood of the World (As Such), Dance of the Headless Bourgeoisie (1993–1999)
For touring in support of Why Do They Call Me Mr. Happy?, Nomeansno assembled their first four-piece lineup, completed by Hanson Brothers guitarist Holliston and second drummer Ken Kempster.  Holliston replaced Kerr as their full-time guitarist, while Kempster went on to tour sporadically with Nomeansno over the next four years.

The first Nomeansno album to feature Holliston was The Worldhood of the World (As Such), released in 1995.  Receiving its title from philosopher Martin Heidegger's seminal text Being and Time, the album featured simpler and more melodic songs than its predecessors while nonetheless retaining the band's "taste for blood and gristle." After focusing briefly on the Hanson Brothers and releasing their second LP, Sudden Death, Nomeansno followed with the EPs Would We Be Alive? and In the Fishtank 1, each featuring a cover of "Would We Be Alive?" by The Residents.

Their eighth studio album, the double LP Dance of the Headless Bourgeoisie, was released in 1998.  The album featured some of the band's longest songs, including its title track.  The album received mixed, but generally positive, reviews.  In a retrospective review, AllMusic critic Tom Schulte praised the album in its experimental tone as "dark and unforgettable, poignant and cutting." A critic writing for The A.V. Club, however, dismissed the album as "dull, meandering punk" and likened the band pejoratively to Rush.

One, All Roads Lead to Ausfahrt (2000–2006)

The band issued its final Alternative Tentacles album, One, in 2000.  Featuring a slow stoner rock cover of The Ramones's "Beat on the Brat" and a fifteen-minute version of Miles Davis's "Bitches Brew" with electric piano and congas, the album was well received.  AllMusic's Schulte assessed the album as "intense and heavy collegiate punk" as praised it as the band's finest effort since Wrong.  Three outtakes from the album were also issued as the Generic Shame EP on Wrong.

The band left Alternative Tentacles in 2002, and began slowly reissuing their back catalogue through Wrong and distributors Southern Records.  With new drummer Ernie Hawkins, The Hanson Brothers released their third album, My Game, later that year.  Nomeansno continued touring extensively, but ultimately took six years to release their next album.  In the meantime, they issued the best-of compilation The People's Choice.

Their tenth studio album, All Roads Lead to Ausfahrt,  was released on August 22, 2006, by AntAcidAudio in the United States and Southern in Europe. AllMusic critic Jo-Ann Greene praised the album's exhausting diversity as befitting of the band's legacy and career-spanning accomplishments.  Greene wrote that with the record Nomeansno travel "yet again through the undergrowth and underbelly of the rock realm, and with all the piss and vinegar that they started out with a quarter century ago."

Later years, retirement (2007–2016)
The band toured frequently in the years that followed, but ceased recording albums.  Fang drummer Mike Branum joined The Hanson Brothers in 2008.  In 2010, Nomeansno digitally released outtakes and demos from the 0 + 2 = 1 sessions as 0 + 2 = 1 ½.  They next released two four-track EPs, Tour EP 1 (alternatively known as Old) and Tour EP 2 (alternatively Jubilation).  They continued performing live through 2013, and toured as The Hanson Brothers in the following year with Byron Slack on drums, but entered a hiatus thereafter.

Holliston continued to perform with The Showbusiness Giants and release solo albums, while John Wright began working as musical director for the all-robot rock band Compressorhead.  In 2015, Nomeansno was inducted into the Western Canadian Music Hall of Fame.  They played an acoustic set at the awards ceremony, and a Ramones cover set (with Slack on drums) on New Year's Eve, which became their final public appearances.  Holliston announced his departure from the band in August 2016.  On September 24, John Wright announced the band's official retirement.

In 2021, Wrong was named the public vote winner of the Polaris Heritage Prize at the 2021 Polaris Music Prize.

Band members
Rob Wright – bass, vocals, guitar (1979–2016)
John Wright – drums, vocals, keyboards (1979–2016)
Andy Kerr – guitar, vocals, bass (1983–1992)
Tom Holliston – guitar, vocals (1993–2016)
Ken Kempster – drums (1993–1997)

Timeline

Discography

Studio albums
Mama (1982)
Sex Mad (1986)
Small Parts Isolated and Destroyed (1988)
Wrong (1989)
0 + 2 = 1 (1991)
Why Do They Call Me Mr. Happy? (1993)
The Worldhood of the World (As Such) (1995)
Dance of the Headless Bourgeoisie (1998) 
One (2000)
All Roads Lead to Ausfahrt (2006)

Collaborative albums
The Sky Is Falling and I Want My Mommy (with Jello Biafra) (1991)

Live albums
Live + Cuddly (1991)

EPs
Betrayal, Fear, Anger, Hatred (1981)
You Kill Me (1985)
The Day Everything Became Nothing (1988)
The Power of Positive Thinking (1990)
Would We Be Alive? (1996)
In the Fishtank 1 (1996)
Generic Shame (2001)
Tour EP 1 (2010)
Tour EP 2 (2010)

Singles
"Look, Here Come the Wormies / SS Social Service" (split with Mass Appeal) (1980)
"Dad/Revenge" (1987)
"Oh, Canaduh" (1991)

Compilations
The Day Everything Became Isolated and Destroyed (1988)
Sex Mad/You Kill Me (1991)
Mr. Right & Mr. Wrong: One Down & Two to Go (1994)
The People's Choice (2004)
0 + 2 = 1 ½ (2010)

Bootlegs
Live at the Paradiso Amsterdam – bootleg – VPRO Radio station recording (1988)
Live in Warsaw – bootleg cassette (1990)
Sasquatch – The Man, The Myth, The Compilation  – includes cover tracks "I Don't Care" and "Glad All Over" (1991)
Where are they now file - live compilation, includes "I Want it All" (1991)
The Infamous Scientist 45" – bootleg 7" (1993)
Leave the Seaside – live bootleg 7" (1994)

Compilation appearances
It Came from the Pit (1986)
Random Thought: A Victoria Sampler (Volumes 1 & 2) – includes, "Getting Colder", "Burn" and "Love Thang" (1986)
Oops!  Wrong Stereotype  (Alternative Tentacles compilation) (1988)
Terminal City Ricochet (soundtrack Terminal City Ricochet movie) (1990)
Clam Chowder & Ice Vs. Big Macs and Bombers (1992)
Virus 100 (a cappella version of Dead Kennedys song, "Forward to Death") (1992)
Over a Century of Vivisection and Anti-Vivisection (How Much Longer?) – Includes the 1981 Mama outtake, "No Means No" (1992)
The Making of Allied One Two Three (1995)
Basement Tapes: A KSPC Compilation of Live Recordings  – includes "I Don't Want To Go Down To The Basement" (1995)
Short Music for Short People (1999)
Sex With Nothing (2002)
Fubar: The Album (2002)
All Your Ears Can Hear (2007)

Videography
Would We Be...Live? (Live footage of Nomeansno and The Hanson Brothers, filmed in London, on DVD) (2004)
We Played At Squats (Portrait about Nomeansno and The Hanson Brothers, produced in Austria, on DVD) (2014)

See also
List of bands from Canada

References

External links

 Nomeansno discography
 

1979 establishments in British Columbia
2016 disestablishments in British Columbia
Alternative Tentacles artists
Musical groups established in 1979
Musical groups disestablished in 2016
Musical groups from Vancouver
Canadian hardcore punk groups
Canadian post-hardcore musical groups
Sibling musical groups